Sayyar al Jamil is a Research Professor at the Arab Center for Research and Policy Studies in Doha, Qatar. Jamil was born in Iraq in 1952, and lived in Mosul before receiving his PhD at the University of St Andrews in Scotland.

Writings on generational throughout Arab history

References

Iraqi scholars
University of Mosul alumni
1962 births
Living people